Soul Survivor is a global Christian movement based in Watford, Hertfordshire. It oversees several Christian summer festivals aimed at young people along with other events throughout the year. Soul Survivor hosted its final Summer festivals in 2019.

History
By 1993 the number of young people attending the annual Summer New Wine Christian Family Conference at the Royal Bath and West Showground in Somerset was significant enough for the organisers of New Wine to launch a special youth event. The first Soul Survivor conference took place in the Summer of 1993 under the leadership of Mike Pilavachi, a youth worker at St Andrew's Church, Chorleywood. Like New Wine, the Soul Survivor conferences were originally overseen by St Andrew's Church. The conference was the inspiration of Pilavachi and one of his church youth club members, Matt Redman who regularly led the worship at early Soul Survivor events aged 15.

1,896 young people attended the first Soul Survivor festival and in 1995, the event split across two weeks (Soul Survivor A and Soul Survivor B). By 2006 attendance at the events was around 25,000 spread over the two weeks. In 2007 Soul Survivor C was launched at the Royal Cheshire Showground, but there was a reshuffle in 2008 when Soul Survivor A moved to the Stafford County showground with B and C remaining at the Royal Bath and West Showground.

The Momentum festival, aimed at students and young people in their twenties and thirties was founded in 2004, and a new event called Naturally Supernatural was launched in 2017.

A fourth week of Soul Survivor was launched in July 2014 at the Thainstone Centre in Inverurie, Scotland but has since moved to Lendrick Muir in Kinross.

For 2017 Soul Survivor moved to the East of England showground near Peterborough for the Soul Survivor B and Soul Survivor C festivals.

Soul Survivor festival finished on 27 August 2019 at the East of England show ground near Peterborough. The final meeting started in a thunder storm after an extremely hot week with lightning believed to have hit the Big Top and ended with Amazing Grace sung by the 9,000 people there; after being started by the band, the song was finished a capella, with the band exiting the stage, leaving the cross lit up. The meeting was followed by a fireworks display and a live band. Soul Survivor officially finished at 23:30 on Tuesday 27 August 2019 after 27 years of festivities.

Although the summer festivals have come to an end the Soul Survivor church still runs events such as Saturday Celebrations and Worship and Preaching teaching days.

Church
While it shares its name and leadership with Soul Survivor, Soul Survivor Watford is a separate organisation and registered charity from Soul Survivor. It is based in two converted warehouses in Watford, Hertfordshire. It was established in 1993 by Mike Pilavachi.

Festivals
Until 2019, five separate Soul Survivor festivals took place every year within the UK:

Soul Survivor A - A 5-day festival based at the Stafford County Showground in Staffordshire aimed at teenagers.
Soul Survivor B & C - Two 5-day festivals based at the East of England showground near Peterborough, aimed at teenagers. (Before 2017 it was held at the Royal Bath and West Showground near Shepton Mallet in Somerset)
Naturally Supernatural - A 6-day festival based at the Stafford County Showground aimed at the whole church family.

Soul Survivor Scotland - A 5-day festival based at Lendrick Muir in Kinross aimed at teenagers.

The festivals consist of seminars, sporting events and art, music and drama workshops during the day, and a charismatic worship service followed by live bands in the evening.

Live albums
The worship at the Soul Survivor festivals is recorded, and each year a live album is released with the most popular new songs from the festival. Each album often contains original songs from Soul Survivor's worship team, as well as traditional and contemporary songs from other artists and ministries.

"Soul In The City"
"Soul In The City London" was a 2004 outreach mission in which 20,000 young people from around the world gathered in London to undertake practical projects and evangelistic events.

The idea for Soul In The City started with Message 2000 and Festival: Manchester which were jointly held by Soul Survivor and The Message Trust

Soul Survivor also organised "Soul In The City Durban" which took place in Summer 2009 in Durban, South Africa.

Worldwide
Soul Survivor has spread across the globe and now holds festivals and other events in the following locations:

See also
 World Wide Message Tribe
 The Message Trust
 New Wine - a similar event aimed at families, which also originated from St. Andrews.
 Survivor Records - a record label affiliated with Soul Survivor, distributed by Kingsway Communications.
 Worship Central

References

External links
 Global Soul Survivor Homepage
 Soul Action Homepage
 Momentum Homepage
 Worship Central Homepage

Christian conferences
Christian organisations based in the United Kingdom
Christian festivals